Kpone Thermal Power Station is a  gas-fired thermal power station in Ghana.

Location
The coordinates of the power station are:05°44'06.0"N, 0°00'38.0"E (Latitude:5.734998; Longitude:0.010548).

Overview
The station is under construction since 2012 and is expected to come online in 2016. It is owned by the parastatal company called Volta River Authority.

See also

 List of power stations in Ghana
 Electricity sector in Ghana

References

External links
Ghana: The Best Mix of Power Sources - the Way Forward for Ghana

Oil-fired power stations in Ghana
Natural gas-fired power stations in Ghana
Eastern Region (Ghana)